In mathematics, in Diophantine geometry, the conductor of an abelian variety defined over a local or global field F is a measure of how "bad" the bad reduction at some prime is.  It is connected to the ramification in the field generated by the torsion points.

Definition
For an abelian variety A defined over a field F as above, with ring of integers R, consider the Néron model of A, which is a 'best possible' model of A defined over R. This model may be represented as a scheme over

Spec(R)

(cf. spectrum of a ring) for which the generic fibre constructed by means of the morphism

Spec(F) → Spec(R)

gives back A.  Let A0 denote the open subgroup scheme of the Néron model whose fibres are the connected components.  For a maximal ideal P of R with residue field k, A0k is a group variety over k, hence an extension of an abelian variety by a linear group.  This linear group is an extension of a torus by a unipotent group.  Let uP be the dimension of the unipotent group and tP the dimension of the torus.  The order of the conductor at P is

where  is a measure of wild ramification. When F is a number field, the conductor ideal of A is given by

Properties
 A has good reduction at P if and only if  (which implies ).
 A has semistable reduction if and only if  (then again ).
 If A acquires semistable reduction over a Galois extension of F of degree prime to p, the residue characteristic at P, then δP = 0.
 If , where d is the dimension of A, then .
Then

References

 
 

Abelian varieties
Diophantine geometry
Algebraic number theory